The Aamby Valley Asian Masters was an Asian Tour golf tournament that was played only once, in May 2006 at the Aamby Valley Golf Club in Mumbai. 

The Asian Masters was one of two Asian Tour events in India that year alongside the Hero Honda Indian Open. The prize fund was US$400,000 and the winner was Hendrik Buhrmann of South Africa, who finally won his first Asian Tour event after eleven years of trying.

Winners

External links
Coverage on the Asian Tour's official site
2006 Asian Tour

Former Asian Tour events
Golf tournaments in India
Sport in Maharashtra
2006 establishments in Maharashtra